Zhailaukol is a village in Sarysu District, Jambyl Region, Kazakhstan. It is the administrative center of the Kamkala Rural District (KATO code - 316039200). Population:  

Kazakh band MuzArt perform a song about the village composed by Ilia Zhakanov.

Geography

References

Populated places in Jambyl Region
Chu (river)